Christopher Juel Barriere (July 11, 1972 – November 10, 2016), professionally known as 3-2, was an American rapper and a member of southern hip hop groups Convicts, Blac Monks, Southside Playaz and Screwed Up Click. He achieved success by his time with Rap-A-Lot Records. Barriere was fatally shot in the head at a gas station in Houston.

Discography

Studio albums

Collaboration albums

Guest appearances

See also
 List of murdered hip hop musicians

References

External links 
 3-2 discography at Discogs

1972 births
2016 deaths
American male rappers
Rappers from Houston
Screwed Up Click members
Rap-A-Lot Records artists
African-American male rappers
Deaths by firearm in Texas
Murdered African-American people
People murdered in Texas
Male murder victims
20th-century African-American people
21st-century African-American people